Khari Sharif is an agricultural area between Mirpur and Jhelum of Azad Kashmir, Pakistan. Broadly speaking, Alaqa-e-Khari (translation in English: Area of Khari) refers to the fertile plains of Khari which exist between the mountains of Mirpur and the river Jhelum. Khari has some 80 small and large villages and one of the villages itself is known as Khari Sharif. It is located at a distance of 8 km from the city of Mirpur, Azad Kashmir and is known for housing the shrines of Sufi saints known as Pir Shah Ghazi Qalandar Damri Wali Sarkar and Mian Muhammad Bakhsh. 

The place acts as a great seat of learning for students of Islam. Historically it was a residence of a famous dervish of this region.

According to the 1998 Pakistan Census, the population was 9,632.

See also
 Baba Shadi Shaheed

References

External links
 Khari Sharif

Populated places in Mirpur District